Ray Austin (born October 31, 1970) is an American professional boxer who challenged for the IBF and IBO heavyweight titles in 2007.

Professional career
Austin has drawn with other notable heavyweights Lance Whitaker, Larry Donald, and Sultan Ibragimov. Austin is also known for his TKO victory over Jo el Scott, the final professional bout for Scott.

In 2007, Austin was promoted to the International Boxing Federation's mandatory challenger due to his draw with Sultan Ibragimov. He challenged Wladimir Klitschko on March 10, 2007, and lost at 1:23 in the second round by technical knockout.

Austin also competed in Cedric Kushner's Thunderbox Heavyweight Tournament, "Fistful of Dollars", but lost.

Austin most recently defeated Domonic Jenkins, Andrew Golota and Julius Long.

In his most recent fight in a WBC Title Eliminator on October 31, 2009, against DaVarryl Williamson who he defeated by fourth round technical knockout after knocking him down as Williamson got up the referee stops the fight.

Professional boxing record

External links
 

1970 births
Living people
American male boxers
Heavyweight boxers